Boulder Glacier is located in the U.S. state of Montana in Glacier National Park (U.S.). The glacier is situated to the north of Boulder Peak and west of the Continental Divide. Between 1966 and 2005, Boulder Glacier lost more than 75 percent of its surface area. As of 2005 the glacier was measured to cover only , and no longer met the  threshold often cited as the minimal area to qualify as an active glacier.

Boulder Glacier was photographed in 2007 by researchers from the U.S. Geological Survey and those images demonstrate that the glacier has almost disappeared. Earlier images taken in 1910 depict a glacier that was far larger than what was recorded in 2007.

See also
List of glaciers in the United States
Glaciers in Glacier National Park (U.S.)

References

Glaciers of Flathead County, Montana
Glaciers of Glacier National Park (U.S.)
Glaciers of Montana